What I Did on My Vacation is an official compilation album from Ian Gillan, released in 1986 in UK by 10 Records. The album covers Gillan's recordings between 1977 and 1982 and was released in three formats (2LP, CD, MC). All songs from the album had been previously released. Although not credited on the cover, "Scarabus" is preceded by an instrumental piece by Colin Towns, which was used as the intro to "On The Rocks" (from the Glory Road album). The LP version set boasts four more tracks than the CD version.

Critical reception
Jeff Clark-Meads, reviewer of British music newspaper Music Week, left neutral review on album. He simply stated that the album contains "Gillan's finer moments with bands that have borne his name" within "a period between leaving and re-joining Deep Purple."

Track listing

LP
Side One
 "Scarabus" - 1977
 "Money Lender" - 1977
 "Puget Sound" - 1979
 "Mad Elaine" - 1977
Side Two
 "Time and Again" - 1980
 "Vengeance" - 1979
 "No Easy Way" - 1980
 "If I Sing Softly" - 1981
Side Three
 "I'll Rip Your Spine Out" - 1981
 "New Orleans" - 1981
 "Mutually Assured Destruction" - 1981
 "Unchain Your Brain" - 1980
 "You're So Right" - 1982
 "No Laughing In Heaven" - 1981
Side Four
 "Long Gone" - 1982
 "If You Believe Me" - 1981
 "Trouble" - 1981
 "Bluesy Blue Sea" - 1982
 "Lucille" - 1980

CD
 "Scarabus"
 "Money Lender"
 "Puget Sound"
 "No Easy Way"
 "If I Sing Softly"
 "I'll Rip Your Spine Out"
 "New Orleans"
 "Mutually Assured Destruction"
 "You're So Right"
 "No Laughing In Heaven"
 "Long Gone"
 "If You Believe Me"
 "Trouble"
 "Bluesy Blue Sea"
 "Lucille"

Personnel
Ian Gillan - lead vocals, harmonica (1978-1982)
Colin Towns - keyboards (1978-1982)
Ray Fenwick - guitar, backing vocals (1977)
Bernie Tormé - guitar (1979-1981)
Janick Gers - guitar (1981-1982)
John Gustafson - bass guitar, backing vocals (1977)
John McCoy - bass guitar (1979-1982)
Mark Nauseef - drums, backing vocals (1977)
Mick Underwood - drums (1979-1982)

Production notes
Compiled by Harris
Engineered by Steve Smith, Mick Glossop
Engineered by Paul "Chas" Watkins
Album digitally re-mastered at Tape One Studios, London

References

External links 
 Ian Gillan Official Website

Ian Gillan albums
1986 compilation albums